Hoplosternum is a small genus of freshwater catfish in the Callichthyinae subfamily of the armored catfish family.

A fossil catfish has been identified as Hoplosternum sp. from the middle Miocene in the La Venta formation, Magdalena River basin, Colombia.

Taxonomy
The name Hoplosternum is derived from the Greek hoplon (weapon) and sternon (chest).

Species 
There are currently three described species in this genus:
 Hoplosternum littorale (Hancock, 1828) (Atipa)
 Hoplosternum magdalenae C. H. Eigenmann, 1913 (Striped hoplo)
 Hoplosternum punctatum Meek & Hildebrand, 1916

Distribution
Hoplosternum species are found in tropical Central and South America especially in Guyana.

It is called "Hassa" by the locals.

Ecology
Hoplosternum is normally found in large schools on the muddy bottoms of slow-moving rivers, pools, drainage ditches, and swampy areas.  In water with low oxygen content, the fish are capable of utilizing atmospheric air by taking in a gulp of air at the surface of the water and passing it back to the hind gut.  The walls of the gut are lined with tiny blood vessels into which the oxygen from the air can pass, similar to the function of true lungs.  The remaining gasses pass out through the anus.   When there is a severe drought, these air breathers are  able to traverse short stretches of land seeking better conditions.   The fish is also capable of making sounds; both grunts and squeaks.

Like other callichthyines, Hoplosternum species build bubble nests. Among callichthyines, H. littorale has the most complex nest structure.

Reproduction
Hoplosternum is a builder of bubblenests from plant parts, some bottom materials, and bubbles formed by a mouth secretion and air.  The male forms a mass of bubbles about 20 cm (8 in.) in diameter and 10 cm (4 in) high.  During the time of construction, the female is actively chased away or ignored.   When the nest construction is complete, the male will accept the female.   The eggs (up to several hundred) are deposited into the nest and the male or the pair will actively protect the nest for about four weeks until the fry come out of the nest at the size of 2.5 cm (1 in).

Cuisine
Hoplosternum is also known by the nickname "Hassa" in Guyana and other parts of South America. It is called "Cascadoux" in Trinidad and Tobago.  It is eaten by Indo-Caribbeans and is normally served curried with roti, rice or pigeon peas.

References

Callichthyidae
Fish of South America
Freshwater fish genera
Catfish genera
Taxa named by Theodore Gill